KUNP (channel 16) is a television station licensed to La Grande, Oregon, United States, affiliated with the Spanish-language Univision network. It is owned by Sinclair Broadcast Group alongside Portland-based ABC affiliate KATU (channel 2). Both stations share studios on NE Sandy Boulevard in Portland, while KUNP's transmitter is located east of Cove atop Mount Fanny, within eastern Oregon's Wallowa–Whitman National Forest.

Because of the location of its transmitter facilities  from Downtown Portland, KUNP's over-the-air signal is unable to reach Portland proper. To overcome this, its signal is relayed on a low-power translator station, KUNP-LD (channel 47), which serves the immediate Portland area from a transmitter on NW Willamette Stone Park Road (near NW Skyline Boulevard) in the Sylvan-Highlands section of Portland, along with cable and satellite coverage folded into KATU's retransmission consent agreements to cover the market, along with some outlying areas. It also previously relayed its signal via analog translator KABH-LP (channel 15) in Bend. KABH was owned by WatchTV, Inc., alongside its crosstown Portland HSN affiliate KORK-CA, but was operated by Sinclair under a local marketing agreement (LMA). KABH's license was canceled by the Federal Communications Commission (FCC) on March 19, 2015, for failure to file a license renewal application.

History

The station was founded on August 6, 1999, and formally signed on the air on December 3, 2001 as KBPD; it changed its call letters to KPOU on May 14, 2002. The call letters changed again to the current KUNP on December 15, 2006. KABH-LP was founded on June 1, 1992 as K15DO, but did not take to the air until November 3, 1993.

KUNP was originally owned by Equity Broadcasting Corporation; it was acquired by Fisher Communications on November 3, 2006, along with KUNS-TV in Seattle. Fisher would associate the two stations with the ABC affiliates it already owned in those markets, KATU and KOMO-TV. At one point, KUNP also had KKEI-CA as another translator prior to the Fisher acquisition. That station now serves Portland as a Telemundo affiliate. That station is also owned by WatchTV, Inc., owner of the now-defunct KABH-LP.

On August 21, 2012, Fisher Communications signed an affiliation agreement with MundoFox, a Spanish-language competitor to Univision that was owned as a joint venture between Fox International Channels and Colombian broadcaster RCN TV, for KUNP and Seattle sister station KUNS to be carried on both stations as digital subchannels starting in late September. On April 11, 2013, Fisher announced that it would sell its television and radio station properties, including KUNP, to the Sinclair Broadcast Group. The deal was completed on August 8, 2013. MundoFox would eventually rebrand as MundoMax in 2015 before ending all operations on December 1, 2016. This left KUNP-DT2 vacant until mid-February 2017, when it became a charter carrier of Sinclair's English language network TBD.

On May 8, 2017, Sinclair Broadcast Group entered into an agreement to acquire Tribune Media – owner of CW affiliate KRCW-TV (channel 32) – for $3.9 billion, plus the assumption of $2.7 billion in debt held by Tribune, pending regulatory approval by the FCC and the U.S. Department of Justice's Antitrust Division. KUNP would not have been affected as its contours do not overlap with either KATU or KRCW. However, as current FCC rules forbid broadcasters from legally owning more than two full-power television stations in a single market and require at least eight distinct owners after the creation of a duopoly (there would be too few remaining if a new one is created), the companies would have been required to sell either KATU or KRCW to another station group in order to comply with FCC ownership rules preceding approval of the acquisition; however, a sale of either station to an independent buyer was dependent on later decisions by the FCC regarding local ownership of broadcast television stations and future acts by Congress.

On July 18, 2018, the FCC voted to have the Sinclair–Tribune acquisition reviewed by an administrative law judge amid "serious concerns" about Sinclair's forthrightness in its applications to sell certain conflict properties. Three weeks later on August 9, Tribune announced it would terminate the Sinclair deal, intending to seek other M&A opportunities. Tribune also filed a breach of contract lawsuit in the Delaware Chancery Court, alleging that Sinclair engaged in protracted negotiations with the FCC and the U.S. Department of Justice's Antitrust Division over regulatory issues, refused to sell stations in markets where it already had properties, and proposed divestitures to parties with ties to Sinclair executive chair David D. Smith that were rejected or highly subject to rejection to maintain control over stations it was required to sell.

Technical information

Subchannels
The station's digital signal is multiplexed:

Analog-to-digital conversion
Since KUNP did not sign on-the-air before the April 21, 1997, deadline for the FCC's digital television allotment plan, the station was not granted a companion digital signal. Therefore, on or before June 12, 2009, the station was required to turn off its analog signal and turn on a new digital signal (a method known as a "flash cut") on UHF channel 16. KUNP-LP, as a low-power station, continued to broadcast in analog until April 13, 2012, when it made its flash-cut to digital transmission on UHF channel 47 and changing its callsign suffix from '-LP' to '-LD'.

Translator

Cable and satellite availability
"Must-carry" regulations imposed by the FCC require most cable television providers across the Portland market to carry KUNP on their lineups. In the past under Equity ownership, the station was not available on all cable systems, as many of these providers were under carriage agreements for the national cable feed for the network, which allowed them control of several minutes throughout the day of local commercial time that would not be available if they instead carried KUNP. Equity traditionally depended completely on must-carry to bring its stations to cable providers, and the same was the case with KUNP before the sale of the station to Fisher. Retransmission consent agreements for providers in the Portland market made after Sinclair's purchase of KATU and KUNP effectively made carriage of KUNP compulsory as part of the compensation for carrying KATU (along with its subchannels), though some smaller systems in communities with a relatively low Hispanic population and limited channel capacity have been given a waiver from KUNP carriage.

On April 17, 2012, DirecTV began carrying KUNP's high definition signal as part of its local broadcast station package for the Portland area (on channel 47). Up until that point, the satellite provider only carried the station's standard definition signal.

References

External links

Hispanic and Latino American culture in Portland, Oregon
Univision network affiliates
Charge! (TV network) affiliates
TBD (TV network) affiliates
Television channels and stations established in 2001
UNP
La Grande, Oregon
2001 establishments in Oregon
Spanish-language television stations in Oregon
Sinclair Broadcast Group